The men's 10,000 metres at the 1950 European Athletics Championships was held in Brussels, Belgium, at Heysel Stadium on 23 August 1950.

Medalists

Results

Final
23 August

Participation
According to an unofficial count, 14 athletes from 11 countries participated in the event.

 (2)
 (1)
 (1)
 (2)
 (1)
 (1)
 (1)
 (1)
 (1)
 (1)
 (2)

References

10000 metres
10,000 metres at the European Athletics Championships